Craig Scott (born 24 March 1983 in Mildura, Victoria) is an Australian professional golfer.

Scott won the 2002 Victorian Amateur Championship before turning professional in 2004.

Team appearances
Amateur
Australian Men's Interstate Teams Matches (representing Victoria): 2001, 2003 (winners)

References

External links

Australian male golfers
PGA Tour of Australasia golfers
1983 births
Living people